Sp3 transcription factor, also known as SP3, refers to both a protein and the gene it is encoded by.

This gene belongs to a family of Sp1 related genes that encode transcription factors that regulate transcription by binding to consensus GC- and GT-box regulatory elements in target genes. This protein contains a zinc finger DNA-binding domain and several transactivation domains, and has been reported to function as a bifunctional transcription factor that either stimulates or represses the transcription of numerous genes. Transcript variants encoding different isoforms have been described for this gene, and one has been reported to initiate translation from a non-AUG (AUA) start codon. Additional isoforms, resulting from the use of alternate downstream translation initiation sites, have also been noted.

Interactions
Sp3 transcription factor has been shown to interact with Histone deacetylase 2, PIAS1, E2F1 and GABPA.

References

Further reading

Transcription factors